ICGS Veera is the third in a series of seven s built by L&T for the Indian Coast Guard, designed and constructed in India as part of Make in India concept of the Central government.

Introduction
ICGS Veera, the third in the series of seven offshore patrol vessels built by L&T at its shipbuilding facility at Kattupalli in Chennai, was commissioned on 15 April 2019, at a ceremony held at Naval Jetty at the dockyard in Visakhapatnam. It enhances coastal security and is part of indigenisation and fleet augmentation under 'Make in India' programme.

The Indian Coast Guard, which was formed in 1978, has emerged as the fourth largest force in coastal security in the world.

Veera is equipped with the state-of-the-art machinery comprising an integrated bridge system, which includes advanced navigation and communication technology and integrated platform management system.

A ship of the same name, of an older Vikram class, was decommissioned in 2013.

See also

References

External links

Indian Coastguard official page
Gross Tonnage listing
ICGS Vikram decommissioned
L&T Launches 4th Offshore Patrol Vessel for Coast Guard

Fast attack craft of the Indian Coast Guard
Patrol ship classes
Ships of the Indian Coast Guard
Indian Coast Guard